Luara Gurgenovna Hayrapetyan (born 29 September 1997 in Astrakhan, Russia) is an Armenian-Russian singer. She represented Armenia at the Junior Eurovision Song Contest 2009 in Kyiv, Ukraine with her self-composed pop song "Barcelona", finishing in joint second place.

Biography

Hayrapetyan was born in Astrakhan, Russia. She began singing at the age of four, studying at the children's music studio "Vesnushki" of the Astrakhangasprom Cultural Centre, where she was a leading soloist, as well as attending gymnasium. Hayrapetyan's hobbies included ballroom dancing and vocal classes. Having Armenian citizenship, Hayrapetyan also resided in Kapan, Armenia, where she took further vocal, saxophone and dance classes.

She currently lives in Los Angeles, USA.

Career

The first brush with fame was when Luara entered into the Russian national selection for the Junior Eurovision Song Contest 2006. At just 9, she came 2nd with her song "Krasnaya Shapochka" (Little Red Riding Hood). Hayrapetyan competed at the 2008 Slavianski Bazaar in Vitebsk Children's Contest. Representing Russia under the name "Lara", Hayrapetyan was presented with the Grand Prix Award and "Lira" Diploma.

Hayrapetyan is perhaps best known for her representation of Armenia at the 2009 Junior Eurovision Song Contest held in Kyiv, Ukraine. Hayrapetyan performed the song "Barcelona", tying for second place overall with Russia's Ekaterina Ryabova.

Prior to her qualification for the 2009 Contest, Hayrapetyan competed in National Finals for the Junior Eurovision Song Contest twice. In 2006, at Russia's National Final, Hayrapetyan placed 2nd with her song "Krasnaya Shapochka". In 2008, at Armenia's National Final, she placed 3rd with her song, "Im Ergy".

Awards and honours (2004–2010) 

 2004 – I Prize Winner of the International Contest "Malen'kie Zvezdochki" (Tuapse, All-Russian Children Center "Orlenok") 
 2005 – I Prize Winner of the International Festival "Childhood Without Borders" (Moscow, Russia) 
 2006 – Qualified for the Russian National Final of Junior Eurovision (2nd place)
 2007 – Grand Prix Winner of the All-Russian Contest "Volzhskie Sozvezdiya" (Samara, Russia)  I Prize Winner of the VI All-Russian Contest "Voices of the 21st Century" (Anapa, Russia)  May 2007 Laureate of "Gasprom" OJSC in "Estrada Vocal" nomination (Kazan, Russia) (Vladimir, Russia) 
 2008 – January 2008 Diploma Winner of VII City Festival of Young Pianists "Music Rainbow"  Best among pupils of 4th form in knowledge of English  April 2008 I Prize Winner in "Voices of the 21st Century" interregional final  Grand Prix Winner of "Slavianski Bazaar in Vitebsk" Junior Edition, winner of the "Lira" Special Prize (Belarus)  Qualified for Armenian National Final of Junior Eurovision (3rd place) 
 2009 – Qualified for Junior Eurovision Song Contest 2009.  November 2009 – 2nd place at Junior Eurovision Song Contest 2009 (Kyiv, Ukraine)  Qualified for the International Final of "New Wave Junior" contest (Moscow, Russia).
 2009 – Competed at New Wave Junior 2009.

References

1997 births
People from Astrakhan
Russian people of Armenian descent
Living people
Armenian expatriates in the United States
21st-century Armenian women singers
Armenian child singers
Junior Eurovision Song Contest entrants for Armenia
Armenian pop singers
21st-century Russian women singers
21st-century Russian singers